Bleach bypass, also known as skip bleach or silver retention, is a chemical effect which entails either the partial or complete skipping of the bleaching function during the processing of a color film. By doing this, the silver is retained in the emulsion along with the color dyes. The result is a black-and-white image over a color image. The images usually have reduced saturation and exposure latitude, along with increased contrast and graininess. It usually is used to maximum effect in conjunction with a one-stop underexposure.

Technique 
Bleach bypass can be done to any photochemical step in the process, be it original camera negative, interpositive, internegative, or release print. For motion pictures, it is usually applied at the internegative stage, as insurance companies usually are reluctant to have the camera negative bleach bypassed, or the interpositive (a "protection"/"preservation" element), in the event that the look is agreed to be too extreme, and the cost of the process for each individual release print is most often cost-prohibitive. The effect, however, will render slightly differently at each stage, especially between the camera negative and interpositive stages.

Bleach bypass generally refers to a complete circumvention of the bleach stage of development, and is the most commonly offered service among labs. Technicolor's ENR and OZ and Deluxe Labs' ACE and CCE processes are proprietary variants which allow the film to be only partially bleached, giving the cinematographer a more finely tuned control over the effect rendered by the process.

While originally a laboratory technique, a similar effect can now be achieved digitally through digital intermediate color grading.

Use in film and television 

"Bleach bypass", as used in this context, was first used in Japanese filmmaker Kon Ichikawa's film Her Brother (1960). Kazuo Miyagawa, as Daiei Film's cameraman, invented bleach bypass for Ichikawa's film, inspired by the color rendition in the original release of Moby-Dick (1956), printed using dye-transfer Technicolor, and was achieved through the use of an additional black and white overlay. Actually, this is a throwback to pre-1944 Technicolor, which incorporated a silver-containing "blank receiver" with the silver image printed from the green separation negative, but at 50-percent density, upon which the color dyes were imprinted by utilizing "imbibition"; this concept may have been employed here, but at a different density. Despite this early foray into the technique, it remained overlooked for the most part until its use by Roger Deakins for the movie 1984. The effect has subsequently become a regular development tool in labwork, and has remained in widespread use. Practitioners include cinematographers Rodrigo Prieto, Remi Adefarasin, Darius Khondji, Dariusz Wolski, Walter Carvalho,  Oliver Stapleton, Newton Thomas Sigel, Park Gok-ji, Shane Hurlbut, Steven Soderbergh (as "Peter Andrews"), Tom Stern, Vittorio Storaro, and Janusz Kamiński (notably on Steven Spielberg's Saving Private Ryan and Minority Report).

References

External links 

 "Soup du Jour: Bleach Bypass", American Cinematographer, November 1998.

Cinematic techniques